Ivan Jules Bates (born 1968/1969) is an American politician and lawyer who has served as the State's Attorney of Baltimore since 2023.

Early life
Bates was adopted by his parents, Henry and Cleora, in El Paso, Texas. Due to his father's service in the United States Air Force, his family moved several times, including to Germany, Virginia, and New Mexico, before finally settling in Hampton, Virginia, where Bates attended the segregated Bethel High School, where he graduated with a 1.9 GPA.

After graduating from high school, his father enlisted him in the United States Army, where he was assigned to the 32nd Army Air and Missile Defense Command and worked as a light wheel vehicle mechanic before reaching the rank of private first class. He was honorably discharged from the Army in 1988.

After leaving the military, he enrolled at Howard University, where he served as the second president of the Howard University Student Association before graduating with a bachelor's degree in journalism in 1992. Afterwards, he attended the William & Mary Law School, where he received his Juris Doctor degree in 1995. While at William & Mary, he clerked for the NAACP Legal Defense and Educational Fund. After graduating, Bates wanted to move back to Los Angeles, California, but his mother asked him to move to Baltimore to take care of his aunt Edna.

Career
Bates started his legal career in Baltimore, working as a law clerk for Baltimore Circuit Court Judge David B. Mitchell. He later worked in the homicide division of the Baltimore State's Attorney's Office under state's attorney Patricia Jessamy from July 1996 to June 2002. He left to become a defense attorney for the law firm of Schulman, Treem, Kaminkow, and Ravenell, and worked on the U.S. Supreme Court case Maryland v. Blake.

In 2006, Bates started his own law firm of Bates & Garcia, P.C., in downtown Baltimore. He represented Baltimore Police sergeant Alicia D. White, one of six police officers charged in the arrest and death of Freddie Gray in April 2015, and several clients victimized by the corrupt Gun Trace Task Force, whose members in 2017 were federally indicted and convicted of racketeering. In June 2019, Bates testified before the Commission to Restore Trust in Policing, recommending a number of state law to prevent corruption in Baltimore's criminal justice system.

State's Attorney of Baltimore City

Elections

2018

In 2018, Bates unsuccessfully ran for state's attorney of Baltimore, challenging incumbent state's attorney Marilyn Mosby. He ran on a platform of supporting community policing and curbing gun violence.

During the campaign, Kristien Miller, a supporter of Thiruvendran Vignarajah, filed a lawsuit against Bates alleging that he was not qualified to run for state's attorney. In March 2018, Baltimore Circuit Court Judge Lawrence Fletcher-Hill ruled that Bates had lived in the city since 2016 and was qualified to run for state's attorney.

In May 2018, Bates released a campaign ad in which he claimed that he had "never lost a murder case". He came under fire for this claim, as online court records show that Bates prosecuted eight murders and dropped five of them. Bates defended his claims by providing additional court records that list him as a prosecutor in homicide cases against Lynelle Whiting and Gregory Everett in 2001 and 2002 respectively. In June, he released a list of 11 more cases he claimed as "wins", four of which had ended in convictions. He later threatened to sue the two other candidates in the race, Vignarajah and Mosby, and the Baltimore Afro-American newspaper for defamation, calling the claims made by the candidates related to his murder cases were "absolute lies".

Also in May 2018, Bates told the Rolling Stone that he would drop charges against Adnan Syed, the Serial podcast host who was serving life in prison for his initial conviction in the killing of Hae Min Lee in 1999.

Bates was defeated in the Democratic primary on June 26, 2018, placing second behind Mosby with 28.1 percent of the vote.

2022
On November 18, 2021, Bates announced that he would again run for state's attorney, challenging incumbent state's attorney Marilyn Mosby.

Bates supports improving the technology used in the state's attorney's office, including software programs that would add subtitles to police body camera videos. He unveiled a prosecution plan in March 2022, which includes cracking down on gun violence and restarting prosecutions for nonviolent crimes such as drug possession, prostitution, and trespassing, promising mandatory prison sentences for people convicted on gun charges. He also sought to increase collaboration with the Baltimore Police Department to reduce violent crime. He stressed during the campaign that these policies did not mean the city would be returning to a tough-on-crime mindset that leads to mass incarceration, with many cases being funneled to diversion courts to connect people with alternative treatment services.

In July 2022, Bates told The Baltimore Banner that he planned drop the controversial case against Keith Davis, Jr., who as of August 2022 is scheduled for a fifth murder trial in the fatal shooting of Pimlico Race Course security guard Kevin Jones in 2015. He declined to comment on the case after winning the Democratic primary, saying that "[a]s State's Attorney-elect, I am no longer a private citizen. I must be mindful of the gag order imposed to the current State's Attorney and how it would ethically apply to me".

During the primary, Bates received endorsements from The Baltimore Sun, former Baltimore mayor Sheila Dixon, former mayoral candidate Mary J. Miller, Maryland Senate President Bill Ferguson, state delegate Luke Clippinger, and former state's attorney Greg Bernstein.

Bates defeated incumbent state's attorney Marilyn Mosby and Democratic challenger Thiruvendran Vignarajah in the Democratic primary on July 19, 2022, receiving 40.9 percent of the vote. Bates was to face Independent candidate Roya Hanna in the general election, but she dropped out and endorsed Bates shortly after his primary win, clearing his path to victory.

Tenure
Bates was sworn in as state's attorney on January 3, 2023. On his first day in office, he reversed Mosby's non-prosecution policy for low-level offenses like drug possession, prostitution, and trespassing.

On January 13, Bates ended the State's Attorney's office's prosecution of Keith Davis, Jr., dropping all charges against him. Davis was scheduled to stand trial for a fifth time in May on charges of second-degree murder and use of a firearm.

Personal life
Bates has two daughters named Brielle and London. He lives in the Locust Point community of Baltimore.

In 2021, Bates' third wife, Lana, filed for a divorce.

Hours before Bates was sworn in as State's Attorney of Baltimore, he was hospitalized and treated for dehydration. Despite this, his swearing-in continued to go on as planned.

Electoral history

References

1960s births
20th-century African-American people
20th-century American lawyers
21st-century African-American politicians
21st-century American politicians
African-American lawyers
African-American United States Army personnel
Howard University alumni
Living people
Lawyers from Baltimore
Maryland Democrats
Maryland lawyers
Military personnel from Maryland
People from El Paso, Texas
State's attorneys in Maryland
William & Mary Law School alumni
Year of birth uncertain